Mary Ann Nyberg (February 7, 1923 – September 19, 1979) was an American costume designer who was nominated for two Academy Awards.

Oscar Nominations
Both nominations were in the category of Best Costumes-Color.

1953 Academy Awards – Nominated for The Band Wagon. Lost to The Robe.
1954 Academy Awards – Nominated for A Star is Born. Nomination shared with Jean Louis and Irene Sharaff. Lost to Gate of Hell.

Filmography
The Band Wagon (1953)
Lili (1953) (credited as Mary Anne Nyberg)
Carmen Jones (1954)
A Star Is Born (1954)
The Man with the Golden Arm (1955)

References

External links
 

1923 births
1979 deaths
American costume designers
Artists from Tulsa, Oklahoma
Women costume designers